Vallefoglia is a comune in the province of Pesaro and Urbino, in the Italian region Marche, created in 2014 from the merger of the communes of Colbordolo and Sant'Angelo in Lizzola, after 76,3% of the population approved the unification in a referendum.

The 16th-century parish church of the hamlet of Montefabbri is titled San Gaudenzio.

Likely from Italian valle ("valley") + foglia ("leaf"), thus ("leaf valley").

References

Cities and towns in the Marche